Central Goldfields Shire is a local government area in Victoria, Australia, located in the central part of the state.

It includes the towns of Bealiba, Carisbrook, Dunolly, Maryborough and Talbot. It was formed in 1995 from the amalgamation of the City of Maryborough, most of the Shire of Tullaroop, and parts of the Shire of Bet Bet and Shire of Talbot and Clunes.

The Shire is governed and administered by the Central Goldfields Shire Council; its seat of local government and administrative centre is located at the council headquarters in Maryborough, it also has a service centre located in Talbot. The Shire is named after the region having historically been a major goldfields region in central Victoria.

Council

Current composition
The council is composed of four wards and seven councillors, with four councillors elected to represent the Maryborough Ward and one councillor per remaining ward elected to represent each of the other wards.

In August 2017 the elected council members of the Central Goldfields Shire were removed from office by the Victorian Government. This removal was facilitated due to financial mismanagement. Three administrators were then appointed by Natalie Hutchins the then Local Government Minister to replace the council until the 2020 local government elections. The three administrators are: Noel Harvey OAM, The Hon Hugh Delahunty, and Karen Douglas.

Councillors elected at the 2020 election are:

Administration and governance
The council meets in the council chambers at the council headquarters in the Maryborough Municipal Offices, which is also the location of the council's administrative activities. It also provides customer services at both its administrative centre in Maryborough, and its service centre in Talbot.

Townships and localities
The 2021 census, the shire had a population of 13,483 up from 12,995 in the 2016 census

^ - Territory divided with another LGA
* - Not noted in 2016 Census
# - Not noted in 2021 Census

See also
List of localities (Victoria)

References

External links

Central Goldfields Shire Council official website
Metlink local public transport map
Link to Land Victoria interactive maps

Local government areas of Victoria (Australia)
Loddon Mallee (region)
 
North Central Victoria